The 1979–80 Combined Counties Football League season was the second in the history of the Combined Counties Football League, a football competition in England. This was the first season in which the "Combined Counties League" name was used after the inaugural season was held under the name of the "Home Counties League".

The league was won by Guildford & Worplesdon for the first time.

League table

The league was expanded from 13 to 15 clubs as two new clubs joined:
Godalming & Farncombe United
Virginia Water, joining from the London Spartan League Senior Division

References

External links
 Combined Counties League Official Site

1979-80
1979–80 in English football leagues